The boys' light heavyweight boxing competition at the 2018 Summer Youth Olympics in Buenos Aires was held from 14 to 18 October at the Oceania Pavilion.

Schedule 
All times are local (UTC−3).

Results

Final standings

References

External links
Draw 

Boxing at the 2018 Summer Youth Olympics